The 2020 World Enduro Championship is the 31st season of the FIM World Enduro Championship. The season consists of eight events.

Brad Freeman goes into the championship after winning both the EnduroGP and Enduro 1 classes in 2019. Loic Larrieu is the reigning Enduro 2 champion, with Steve Holcombe going into the season after taking the Enduro 3 title last year.

Calendar
An eight-round calendar was announced in December 2019.

Due to the COVID-19 pandemic, the start of the season was postponed. Portuguese and Spanish Grand Prix postponement was announced on 12 March and on 31 March the events in Italy and Hungary were postponed. In May, the GP of Sweden was cancelled, and GP of Estonia is rescheduled or possibly cancelled as well.

EnduroGP

Riders Championship

Enduro 1

Riders Championship

Enduro 2

Riders Championship

Enduro 3

Riders Championship

Junior

Riders Championship

Junior 1

Riders Championship

Junior 2

Riders Championship

Youth

Riders Championship

Women

Calendar

Entry List

Riders Championship

Open World Cup

Open 2-Stroke

Riders Championship

Open 4-Stroke

Riders Championship

References 

Enduro World
FIM Enduro World Championship